Woody At 100:  The Woody Guthrie Centennial Collection is a 150-page large-format book with three CDs containing 57 tracks, including Woody Guthrie's most important recordings such as the complete version of "This Land Is Your Land," "Pretty Boy Floyd," "I Ain't Got No Home in This World Anymore," and "Riding in My Car." The set also contains 21 previously unreleased performances and six never-before-heard original songs, including Woody's first known—and recently discovered—recordings.  It is an in-depth commemorative collection of songs, photos and essays released by Smithsonian Folkways in June 2012.

Compilation and release
Robert Santelli, CEO of the Grammy Museum, contacted Jeff Place in October 2010 and suggested they compile a Guthrie box set to go along with the celebration of Guthrie's 100th birthday. Santelli and Place looked for the most important and representative of Guthrie's compositions. They also included the earliest known recordings of Guthrie (made in 1939), which were discovered by researcher Peter LaChapelle in 1999.

Design
The design for Woody at 100: The Woody Guthrie Centennial Collection was created by Visual Dialogue, a graphic design company from Boston, Massachusetts. The firm based the collection's design on the plain typography and simple design of classic Folkways Records albums. The box set consists of a 150-page hardcover textbook  containing Guthrie essays, sketches, and photographs. Three pockets hold CDs in the last pages of the book.

Reception
Woody at 100 currently holds a 92 rating from aggregate review site Metacritic. Rolling Stone critic David Fricke wrote, "This sumptuous birthday celebration of America's greatest folk singer is really a present to us: two CDs of his greatest songs and recordings, mostly from the mid-1940s, and a disc of illuminating rarities."

Rachel Maddux of Pitchfork wrote, "in the world of Woody at 100, everything about Guthrie's career seems fluid, boundaryless, as if considering him just as a great American musician and not also as a man of letters and a painter, too, has maybe been a huge mistake."

Track listing

Disc 1

This Land Is Your Land (Alternate Version)
Pastures of Plenty
Riding in My Car (Car Song)
The Grand Coulee Dam
Talking Dust Bowl
So Long, It's Been Good to Know Yuh (Dusty Old Dust)
Ramblin' Round
Philadelphia Lawyer
Hard Travelin'
Pretty Boy Floyd
Hobo's Lullaby
Talking Columbia
The Sinking of the Reuben James
Jesus Christ
Gypsy Davy
New York Town
Going Down the Road (Feeling Bad)
Hard, Ain't It Hard
The Biggest Thing That Man Has Ever Done (The Great Historical Bum)
This Land Is Your Land (Standard Version)
Jarama Valley
Why, Oh Why?
I've Got to Know

Disc 2
Better World A-Comin'
When That Great Ship Went Down (The Great Ship)
A Dollar Down and a Dollar a Week
Talking Centralia
1913 Massacre
Dirty Overalls
My Daddy (Flies a Ship in the Sky)
Worried Man Blues
Hangknot, Slipknot
Buffalo Skinners
Howdi Do
Jackhammer John
The Ranger's Command
So Long, It's Been Good to Know You (WWII Version)
What Are We Waiting On?
Lindbergh
Ludlow Massacre
Bad Lee Brown (Cocaine Blues)
Two Good Men
Farmer-Labor Train
The Jolly Banker
We Shall Be Free

Disc 3
I Ain't Got No Home (In This World Anymore)
Them Big City Ways
Do Re Mi
Skid Row Serenade
Radio Program: The Ballad Gazette With Woody Guthrie [This Land Is Your Land; What Did the Deep Sea Say?; Blow Ye Winds; Trouble on the Waters; Blow the Man Down; Normandy Was Her Name; The Sinking of the Reuben James]
BBC: Children's Hour July 7, 1944 [Intro – Wabash Cannonball; 900 Miles; Stagger Lee; Pretty Boy Floyd]
People's Songs Hootenanny [Ladies Auxiliary; Weaver's Life]
WNYC Radio Program: Folk Songs of America December 12, 1940 [John Hardy; Jesse James; Tom Joad]
Reckless Talk
All Work Together
My Little Seed
Goodnight Little Cathy

Credits
Production: Jeff Place, Robert Santelli
Liner Notes: Jeff Place, Robert Santelli, Peter LaChapelle, Guy W. Logsdon
Audio restoration: Pete Reiniger, Eric Conn, Joe Gastwirt, David Glasser, Mickey Hart, Charlie Pilzer, LeAnn Sonenstein
Compilation Mastered By: Pete Reiniger
Executive producers: Daniel E. Sheehy and D.A. Sonneborn
Fact-checking, Proofreading: Tiffany Colannino, Ezra Deutsch-Feldman, Evangeline Mee, Kathryn Mitchell, and Emily Shinay
Production Manager: Mary Monseur
Mastering: Pete Reiniger 
Art Direction & Design: Visual Dialogue

Awards 
Woody at 100: The Woody Guthrie Centennial Collection received two 2013 GRAMMY nominations, winning in the category of Best Boxed Set or Limited Edition Package. The box set also won Independent Music Awards for Best Compilation Album and Best Album Packaging as well as an American Association of Independent Music Libby Award for Creative Packaging.

References

External links
 Woody at 100: The Woody Guthrie Centennial Collection

Woody Guthrie albums
Smithsonian Folkways compilation albums
2012 compilation albums